The 2019 Kebbi State gubernatorial election occurred in Nigeria on March 9, 2019. Incumbent APC Governor Abubakar Atiku Bagudu won re-election for a second term, defeating Isa Galaudu of the PDP.

Abubakar Atiku Bagudu won the primary election after he was returned as the sole candidate. He picked Manasseh Daniel Jatau as his running mate. Usman Bayero Nafada was the PDP candidate with Charles Yau Iliyas as his running mate. 32 candidates contested in the election.

Electoral system
The Governor of Kebbi State is elected using the plurality voting system.

Primary election

APC primary
Abubakar Atiku Bagudu won the primary election after he was returned as the sole candidate. He picked Samaila Dabai Yombe as his running mate.

PDP primary
The PDP primary election was held on September 30, 2018. Isa Mohammed Galaudu won the primary election polling 1,072 votes against 3 other candidates. His closest rival was Umar Tafida who came second with 720 votes, Buhari Bala came third with 322 votes, while Abubakar had 28 votes.

Results
A total number of 32 candidates registered with the Independent National Electoral Commission to contest in the election.

The total number of registered voters in the state was 1,789,975, while 820,078 voters were accredited. Total number of votes cast was 814,084, while number of valid votes was 793,388. Rejected votes were 20,696.

By local government area
Here are the results of the election by local government area for the two major parties. The total valid votes of 793,388 represents the 32 political parties that participated in the election. Blue represents LGAs won by Abubakar Atiku Bagudu. Green represents LGAs won by Isa Mohammed Galaudu.

References 

Kebbi State gubernatorial election
Kebbi State gubernatorial election
Kebbi State gubernatorial elections